Pauly Shore Is Dead is a 2003 American mockumentary comedy film directed, produced, co-written by, and starring Pauly Shore.  The film is a fake documentary that begins as a semi-autobiographical retelling of Shore's early success and dwindling popularity in the late 1990s, after which it documents Shore's (fictional) attempt to fake his own death in order to drum up popularity for his films. It features many cameos.

Plot
The film begins as an autobiographical look at Shore's early professional successes on MTV and as the star of a series of '90s comedies. Shore's film career leads to his taking a starring role in a vehicle on the Fox Network, in which he plays the slacker son of a millionaire. The pilot of the series turns out to be a commercial and critical failure, and Shore becomes a pariah virtually overnight, with his friends distancing themselves from him for fear that it will tarnish their own careers. Shore is ultimately reduced to living in his mother's attic and watching BackDoor Sluts 9 starring his ex-girlfriend, who will no longer see him. He spends his last $84 on a hooker—who does almost nothing for him and his life simply gets worse and worse.

One night, Shore is visited by the ghost of his mentor, comic Sam Kinison, who encourages Shore to fake his own death as a means of revitalizing popularity in Pauly Shore films and merchandise. Shore decides to go through with the plan, which initially works: Once word of his "death" breaks, celebrities eager for the residual publicity begin appearing on television in large numbers to declare Shore a comic genius and lament his early death. Shore, eager to bask in the publicity, begins appearing in public wearing a disguise; he is quickly outed, arrested, and sent to prison.

In prison, Shore is attacked by one of his former fans, "Bucky from Kentucky," a redneck whose world view was shattered when he learned that Shore had willingly put his own fans through the ordeal of thinking he was dead. Shore survives the attack, which causes him to realize that even though he was no longer as famous as he once was, he still had fans who loved him. Shore and Bucky have a heart-to-heart about the nature of celebrity, and Shore decides to start his career over.

After getting out of prison, Shore sets about making Pauly Shore Is Dead to chronicle his own rise and fall, using information he has gathered from years in Hollywood to blackmail various B-list celebrities into appearing in cameos; he reserves the information he has on A-list celebrities for the planned sequel.

Cast
 Pauly Shore as himself and Bucky's Cousin
 W. Earl Brown as Bucky from Kentucky
 Kristin Herold as Bucky's Cousin
 David Kersey as Bucky Jr.
 Miriam Cohen Kiel as Bucky's Daughter
 Kelly Kursten as Bucky's wife
 Timmy Jamieson as Sam Kinison
 Clint Howard as Pauly's Business Manager
 Bobby Lee as Delivery Boy 
 Jason Mewes as Robert Francesco
 Christopher Penn as Half of Gay Couple in Jail
 Sam Rubin as Michael Figliolia
 Lala Sloatman as Hooker In loft
 Marilyn Martinez as The Housekeeper 
As Themselves
 Pamela Anderson
 A. J. Benza
 B-Real
 Todd Bridges
 Tommy Chong
 Carson Daly
 Ellen DeGeneres
 Jewel De'Nyle
 Dustin Diamond
 Andy Dick
 Dr. Dre
 Jerry Dunphy
 Eminem
 Fred Durst
 Sully Erna
 Perry Farrell
 Corey Feldman
 Heidi Fleiss
 Natasha Henstridge
 Nicky Hilton
 Paris Hilton
 Dexter Holland
 Kato Kaelin
 Craig Kilborn
 Sam Kinison (archive footage)
 Tommy Lee
 Kurt Loder
 Mario López
 Michael Madsen
 Bill Maher
 Pat O'Brien
 Nancy O'Dell
 Sean Penn
 Matt Pinfield
 Sally Jessy Raphael
 Chris Rock
 Ja Rule
 Adam Sandler (voice)
 Charlie Sheen
 Tiffany Shepis
 Snoop Dogg
 Britney Spears
 Ben Stiller
 Tom Sizemore
 Verne Troyer

Reception
Pauly Shore Is Dead received mixed reviews, with a 57% rating on Rotten Tomatoes, a notably higher rating than his oft-panned '90s films. It was a box office bomb, however, earning just $11,000 after a very limited release to theaters in Sacramento, California. It won the Audience Choice Award from the Slamdunk Film Festival (for Shore's direction).

References

External links
Official site

2003 films
2003 comedy films
American mockumentary films
2000s English-language films
2000s American films